"The Post War Dream" is the opening track on The Final Cut, an album by the English progressive rock band, Pink Floyd.

Intro
The song's intro features a car radio being tuned in and out of different stations and can be seen on the short film for 'The Final Cut'.

"...a group of business men announced plans to build a nuclear fallout shelter at Peterborough in Cambridgeshire..."
[radio tuning] 
"...three high court judges have cleared the way..."
[radio tuning]
"...It was announced today, that the replacement for the Atlantic Conveyor the container ship lost in the Falklands conflict would be built in Japan, a spokesman for..."
[radio tuning] 
"...moving in. They say the third world countries, like Bolivia, which produce the drug are suffering from rising violence..."

Composition
The song is 3 minutes in length and consists of many sound effects, such as row boats and screaming, typical of the album on which it was released. The music itself begins quietly with harmonium and Waters' hushed vocal, in addition to the sounds of certain orchestral instruments. This segues into a louder, more theatrical section dominated by electric guitars. During this particular section, Waters vocal is shouted, a definite contrast from his manner of singing during the previous part of the song.

The melody of the first part bears a strong resemblance to John Prine's 1971 song "Sam Stone", about a war veteran's tragic fate.  Both songs share the same chord progression, instrumentation, and melody.  They are even in the same key (F Major).

Personnel
Roger Waters – vocals, bass guitar
David Gilmour – guitar
Nick Mason – drums

with:

Michael Kamen – harmonium

References

1983 songs
Pink Floyd songs
Anti-war songs
Rock ballads
Songs written by Roger Waters
Song recordings produced by Roger Waters